Trilochan Pradhan (3 January 1929 – 4 December 2021) was an Indian scientist.

Career
Pradhan obtained his PhD from the University of Chicago in 1956. He headed the Theoretical Nuclear Physics Division at the Saha Institute of Nuclear Physics from 1964 to 1974, was the first director of the Institute of Physics, Bhubaneswar from 1974 to 1989 and served as the vice chancellor of Utkal University from 1989 to 1991.

Books
 The Photon, (Nova Science Publishers, New York), 2001
 Quantum Mechanics (University Press of Hyderabad) 
 Electron Capture by Protons Passing through Hydrogen

Awards
 Kalinga Ratna, 2018
 Kalinga Samman, 2014 
 Padma Bhusan, 1990
 Meghnad Saha Award, 1980

References

1929 births
2021 deaths
People from Nayagarh district
Recipients of the Padma Bhushan in science & engineering
Banaras Hindu University alumni
Ravenshaw University alumni
University of Chicago alumni
20th-century Indian physicists
Scientists from Bhubaneswar